Matt Comyn is the chief executive officer of the Australian Commonwealth Bank.  His appointment was announced on 29 January 2018 by the CBA's board, and took effect from 9 April 2018. He succeeded Ian Narev.

Biography 

Comyn attended Coogee Boys' Prep School and Sydney Boys' High School. Comyn holds an Executive MBA from The University of Sydney, a master's degree in Commerce, majoring in finance, and a bachelor's degree in Aviation, both from the University of New South Wales. He has also completed the General Management Program at Harvard Business School.

After graduation from university, Comyn spent 18 months in a small aviation logistics business.

Comyn joined the Commonwealth Bank in 1999, commencing in the Institutional Banking division. He went on to become Managing Director for Commonwealth Securities in 2006. Before taking the position of CEO, he held position of Group Executive Retail Banking Services, the Commonwealth Bank’s largest business unit for 5.5 years.

References

Australian chief executives
University of Sydney alumni
University of New South Wales alumni
Harvard Business School alumni
Living people
Year of birth missing (living people)